James McCloy (1906 – 1979) was a Scottish professional footballer who played as a goalkeeper.

Career
Born in Howwood, McCloy joined St Mirren from Clyde in October 1933; he made 148 appearances for the Paisley club, and played in the 1934 Scottish Cup Final for them. He moved to Bradford City in August 1938. He made 37 Football League and 1 FA Cup appearances for the club. He left the club in May 1939 to join Swansea Town His career was ended by the Second World War. He later worked as a fireman.

Personal life
His son Peter was also a footballer and a goalkeeper.

Sources

References

1906 births
Date of birth missing
1979 deaths
Date of death missing
Scottish footballers
Clyde F.C. players
St Mirren F.C. players
Bradford City A.F.C. players
Swansea City A.F.C. players
Scottish Junior Football Association players
Scottish Football League players
English Football League players
Association football goalkeepers
Footballers from Renfrewshire